Elke Van Gorp (born 15 May 1995) is a Belgian football midfielder currently playing for Zulte Waregem.

Honours 
Lierse
 Belgian Women's Cup: Winner 2015, 2016

References

External links 
 Elke Van Gorp at RSC Anderlecht
 
 

1995 births
Living people
Belgian women's footballers
Belgium women's international footballers
Women's association football midfielders
RSC Anderlecht (women) players
Super League Vrouwenvoetbal players
BeNe League players
K.A.A. Gent (women) players
Lierse SK (women) players
Sportspeople from Turnhout
Footballers from Antwerp Province
Belgium women's youth international footballers
UEFA Women's Euro 2017 players